Greatest Hits is the first compilation album by American soul group The Chi-Lites.  The album was released in 1972 on the Brunswick label.

Track listing

Charts

Other Editions

Brunswick also released a 13-track edition in discrete 4-channel Quadraphonic as a 7 ½ ips Reel-To-Reel with the catalog number BRU J 14184.  This version left off the following three songs: "Give It Away", "The Coldest Days Of My Life (Part 2)", or "24 Hours Of Sadness". This shortened version of the compilation used the same 16 disc front cover art as the standard LP release.

References

External links
Greatest Hits at Discogs

1972 greatest hits albums
The Chi-Lites albums
Brunswick Records albums
Albums produced by Eugene Record